Irakleio, also known as Iraklio on signage, is an Athens metro station in Irakleio, Attica, Athens, Greece. It is marked at the 19.246 km from the starting point in Piraeus station of Line 1.

Initially, the station served the Athens–Lavrion Railway and Lavrion Square-Strofyli railway, ran by the Attica Railways. From 1929 the Lavrion branch was operated by Piraeus, Athens and Peloponnese Railways. The station was closed in 1938 for Kifissia traffic but remained open for Lavrion trains until 1957/1962. At the same location, the present station of EIS was opened on 4 March 1957, using the same name. It was the northernmost terminus of EIS until Kifissia station was reopened on 10 August 1958. The station has two passenger platforms and a reversing siding.

References and notes

External links
 

Athens Metro stations
Railway stations opened in 1957
Piraeus, Athens and Peloponnese Railways
1957 establishments in Greece